Scapegoating is the practice of singling out a person or group for unmerited blame and consequent negative treatment. Scapegoating may be conducted by individuals against individuals (e.g. "he did it, not me!"), individuals against groups (e.g., "I couldn't see anything because of all the tall people"), groups against individuals (e.g., "He was the reason our team didn't win"), and groups against groups.

A scapegoat may be an adult, child, sibling, employee, peer, ethnic, political or religious group, or country. A whipping boy, identified patient, or "fall guy" are forms of scapegoat.

Scapegoating has its origins in a ritual of atonement described in chapter 16 of the Biblical Book of Leviticus, in which a goat (or ass) is released into the wilderness bearing all the sins of the community, which have been placed on the goat's head by a priest.

At the individual level

A medical definition of scapegoating is:

Scapegoated groups throughout history have included almost every imaginable group of people: genders, religions, people of different races, nations, or sexual orientations, people with different political beliefs, or people differing in behaviour from the majority. However, scapegoating may also be applied to organizations, such as governments, corporations, or various political groups.

Its archetype
Jungian analyst Sylvia Brinton Perera situates its mythology of shadow and guilt. Individuals experience it at the archetypal level. As an ancient social process to rid a community of its past evil deeds and reconnect it to the sacred realm, the scapegoat appeared in a biblical rite, which involved two goats and the pre-Judaic, chthonic god Azazel. In the modern scapegoat complex, however, "the energy field has been radically broken apart" and the libido "split off from consciousness". Azazel's role is deformed into an accuser of the scapegoated victim.

Blame for breaking a perfectionist moral code, for instance, might be measured out by aggressive scapegoaters. Themselves often wounded, the scapegoaters can be sadistic, superego accusers with brittle personas, who have driven their own shadows underground from where such are projected onto the victim. The scapegoated victim may then live in a hell of felt unworthiness, retreating from consciousness, burdened by shadow and transpersonal guilt, and hiding from the pain of self-understanding. Therapy includes modeling self-protective skills for the victim's battered ego, and guidance in the search for inner integrity, to find the victim's own voice.

Projection

Unwanted thoughts and feelings can be unconsciously projected onto another who becomes a scapegoat for one's own problems. This concept can be extended to projection by groups. In this case the chosen individual, or group, becomes the scapegoat for the group's problems. "Political agitation in all countries is full of such projections, just as much as the backyard gossip of little groups and individuals." Swiss psychiatrist Carl Jung considered indeed that "there must be some people who behave in the wrong way; they act as scapegoats and objects of interest for the normal ones".

Scapegoat theory of intergroup conflict

The scapegoat theory of intergroup conflict provides an explanation for the correlation between times of relative economic despair and increases in prejudice and violence toward outgroups. Studies of anti-black violence (racist violence) in the southern United States between 1882 and 1930 show a correlation between poor economic conditions and outbreaks of violence (e.g. lynchings) against blacks. The correlation between the price of cotton (the principal product of the area at that time) and the number of lynchings of black men by whites ranged from −0.63 to −0.72, suggesting that a poor economy induced white people to take out their frustrations by attacking an outgroup.

Scapegoating as a group necessitates that ingroup members settle on one specific target to blame for their problems. Scapegoating is also more likely to appear when a group has experienced difficult, prolonged negative experiences (as opposed to minor annoyances). When negative conditions frustrate a group's attempts at successful acquisition of its most essential needs (e.g., food, shelter), groups develop a compelling, shared ideology that – when combined with social and political pressures – may lead to the most extreme form of scapegoating: genocide.

Scapegoating can also cause oppressed groups to lash out at other oppressed groups. Even when injustices are committed against a minority group by the majority group, minorities sometimes lash out against a different minority group in lieu of confronting the more powerful majority.

Scapegoating has been noted after terrorist attacks and political assassinations; such as Anti-Arabism backlash against Arabs in America after September 11th, 2001, or the retaliations against the Sikhs in the wake of the assassination of Indira Gandhi in India.

In management, scapegoating is a known practice in which a lower staff employee is blamed for the mistakes of senior executives. This is often due to lack of accountability in upper management.

Scapegoat mechanism

Literary critic and philosopher Kenneth Burke first coined and described the expression scapegoat mechanism in his books Permanence and Change (1935), and A Grammar of Motives (1945). These works influenced some philosophical anthropologists, such as Ernest Becker and René Girard.

Girard developed the concept much more extensively as an interpretation of human culture. In Girard's view, it is humankind, not God, who has need for various forms of atoning violence. Humans are driven by desire for that which another has or wants (mimetic desire). This causes a triangulation of desire and results in conflict between the desiring parties. This mimetic contagion increases to a point where society is at risk; it is at this point that the scapegoat mechanism is triggered. This is the point where one person is singled out as the cause of the trouble and is expelled or killed by the group. This person is the scapegoat. Social order is restored as people are contented that they have solved the cause of their problems by removing the scapegoated individual, and the cycle begins again. The keyword here is "content".

Scapegoating serves as a psychological relief for a group of people. Girard contends that this is what happened in the narrative of Jesus of Nazareth, the central figure in Christianity. The difference between the scapegoating of Jesus and others, Girard believes, is that in the resurrection of Jesus from the dead, he is shown to be an innocent victim; humanity is thus made aware of its violent tendencies and the cycle is broken. Thus Girard's work is significant as a reconstruction of the Christus Victor atonement theory.

See also

References
Notes

Further reading
Books

 Colman, A.D. Up from Scapegoating: Awakening Consciousness in Groups (1995)
 Douglas, Tom Scapegoats: Transferring Blame (1995)
 Dyckman, JM & Cutler JA Scapegoats at Work: Taking the Bull's-Eye Off Your Back (2003)
 Girard, René: Violence and the Sacred (1972)
 Girard, René: The Scapegoat (1986)
 Jasinski, James: "Sourcebook on Rhetoric" (2001)
 Perera, Sylvia Brinton, The Scapegoat Complex: Toward a Mythology of Shadow and Guilt (Toronto: Inner City 1986), Studies in Jungian Psychology By Jungian Analysts
 Pillari V Scapegoating in Families: Intergenerational Patterns of Physical and Emotional Abuse (1991)
 Quarmby K Scapegoat: Why We Are Failing Disabled People (2011)
 Wilcox C.W. Scapegoat: Targeted for Blame (2009)
 Zemel, Joel: Scapegoat, the extraordinary legal proceedings following the 1917 Halifax Explosion (2012)

Academic articles

 
 
 
 
 
 
 
 

Reference books

 
 
 

Diversionary tactics
Abuse
Aggression
Injustice
Persecution
Political metaphors referring to people